Vítor Manuel da Costa Araújo (born 16 February 1966), known as Vítor Paneira, is a Portuguese former football player and manager.

A midfielder, he excelled in the late 80s and early 90s with Benfica, to where he arrived from the lower leagues, going on to amass Primeira Liga totals of 335 games and 43 goals over 11 seasons (289/44 in official matches with his main club) – he also appeared for Vitória de Guimarães in the competition.

A Portugal international for eight years, Paneira represented the country at Euro 1996.

Club career
Born in Calendário, Vila Nova de Famalicão, Braga District, Paneira started playing professionally with hometown's F.C. Famalicão, joining F.C. Vizela of the Segunda Liga in the 1987–88 season and also receiving his first under-21 call-ups during the Toulon Tournament.

In the summer of 1988, Paneira signed for S.L. Benfica, and remained there until the end of the 1994–95 campaign, being an undisputed starter for the vast majority of his spell as he helped the Lisbon club to the Primeira Liga championship three times, adding the 1993 Taça de Portugal. He also appeared in the 1990 Champions Cup final, with his side losing 1–0 to A.C. Milan; in the 1992–93 UEFA Cup he scored twice in a 2–1 home win against Juventus FC, coached by Giovanni Trapattoni (albeit in a 4–2 aggregate defeat).

Paneira moved to Vitória S.C. for 1995–96, due to problems with Benfica manager Artur Jorge which was also part of a locker room clean-up – he was team captain when this occurred – and spent four seasons there. In summer 1999 he joined Académica de Coimbra, and retired at 35 after two years in the second division.

International career
Paneira made his debut for Portugal the same year he signed for Benfica, in a 0–0 friendly draw with Sweden on 12 October 1988. In total, he won 44 caps (42 for Benfica and two for Guimarães) and scored four goals in a seven-year period, playing his last international in another friendly, a 1–0 victory over the Republic of Ireland on 29 May 1996.

Paneira was chosen by António Oliveira for the Lusitanos squad that reached the quarter-finals at UEFA Euro 1996, but was one of the few players that never left the bench.

Coaching career
Paneira started his coaching career in 2002, with GD Serzedelo of division four. He also managed his very first club Famalicão, but in the regional leagues.

On 16 December 2009, Paneira was named coach of Boavista FC, with the 2001 league champions now in the third tier. He was appointed at another side from that league, C.D. Tondela, on 24 May 2011, leading them to promotion in the playoffs in his first season.

On 10 June 2012, Paneira signed a one-year contract extension. He was relieved of his duties on 8 November of the following year, leaving the team in the ninth position.

In March 2014, Paneira took charge of Varzim S.C. in the third division. He was fired in early May 2015, after a series of bad results.

Paneira returned to Tondela on 30 May 2015, being appointed manager for the club's first-ever season in the Portuguese top flight. He was dismissed on 6 October, after winning and drawing one each of the first seven games.

Other ventures
Immediately after retiring and still as an active coach, Paneira worked as a sports commentator with cable channel Sport TV.

Career statistics

Club

International
Scores and results list Portugal's goal tally first, score column indicates score after each Paneira goal.

|}

Honours

Player
Benfica
Primeira Divisão: 1988–89, 1990–91, 1993–94
Taça de Portugal: 1992–93
Supertaça Cândido de Oliveira: 1989
European Cup runner-up: 1989–90

Manager
Ribeirão
Terceira Divisão: 2003–04

Tondela
Segunda Divisão: 2011–12

References

External links

1966 births
Living people
People from Vila Nova de Famalicão
Sportspeople from Braga District
Portuguese footballers
Association football midfielders
Primeira Liga players
Liga Portugal 2 players
F.C. Famalicão players
F.C. Vizela players
S.L. Benfica footballers
Vitória S.C. players
Associação Académica de Coimbra – O.A.F. players
Portugal under-21 international footballers
Portugal international footballers
UEFA Euro 1996 players
Portuguese football managers
Primeira Liga managers
Liga Portugal 2 managers
GD Serzedelo managers
Moreirense F.C. managers
F.C. Famalicão managers
Boavista F.C. managers
Gondomar S.C. managers
C.D. Tondela managers
Varzim S.C. managers